Walnut Grove, also known as Robeson Plantation, is a historic plantation house complex and national historic district located near Tar Heel, Bladen County, North Carolina.  The house was built about 1855, and is a two-story, frame house, five bays wide and four bays deep, in the Greek Revival style.  The front and rear facades feature three bay double porches.  Also on the property are the contributing dining dependency, kitchen, dairy, smokehouse, barn, well, cold frame, and scalding vat.

It was added to the National Register of Historic Places in 1975.

References

Historic districts on the National Register of Historic Places in North Carolina
Plantation houses in North Carolina
Houses on the National Register of Historic Places in North Carolina
Greek Revival houses in North Carolina
Houses completed in 1855
Houses in Bladen County, North Carolina
National Register of Historic Places in Bladen County, North Carolina